The discography of Dido, a British pop singer, consists of five studio albums, one demo album (Odds & Ends), two extended plays, 30 singles, and one video album. She debuted in 1993, performing and touring with trip hop group Faithless. In 1997, she began composing solo material and signed a recording contract with Arista Records in the United States.

No Angel, Dido's debut album, was released in June 1999. The following year, rapper Eminem sampled the song "Thank You" in his song "Stan". "Stan" reached number one in the United Kingdom and was certified platinum. The success of the single introduced Dido and No Angel to a worldwide audience. No Angel, composed of pop, rock and electronica songs, reached number one and was certified platinum ten times in the UK. In the US, the album reached number four and was certified platinum four times. The record experienced international success; it sold over 15 million albums. It produced seven singles, three of which reached the top twenty in the UK. In 2002, the album won a BRIT Award for Best British Album.

Life for Rent, Dido's second album, was released in September 2003. The album reached number one and went platinum nine times in the UK. It reached number four in the US and was certified double platinum. Life for Rent sold 13 million records and produced four top forty singles. In 2004, the album's lead single "White Flag" won a BRIT Award for Best British Single and an Ivor Novello Award for International Hit of the Year.

Safe Trip Home, Dido's third album, was released in November 2008. It reached number two in the UK and number thirteen in the US. "Don't Believe in Love" was released as the lead single from the album in October 2008, becoming a modest hit in the United Kingdom, charting at number 54 on the UK Singles Chart; the song also charted in Austria, Belgium, Italy, the Netherlands and Switzerland.

Girl Who Got Away, Dido's fourth album, was released in March 2013 and reached number five in the UK. "No Freedom" was released as the lead single from the album in January 2013 and peaked at number 51 in the United Kingdom, also charting across mainland Europe. "End of Night" was released as the second single from the album in May 2013, but failed to chart on any major charts. Since 1999, Dido has sold over 40 million albums worldwide.

Greatest Hits, Dido's first compilation album, was released in November 2013, it reached number 27 in the UK. The album compiles all of Dido's singles from her four albums No Angel (1999), Life for Rent (2003), Safe Trip Home (2008) and Girl Who Got Away (2013). The album also includes a new track, "NYC", as well as a collection of remixes and collaborations.

Dido's fifth studio album, Still on My Mind was released on 8 March 2019 ad charted at number 3 on the Official UK Album chart, number 1 on the UK Indie Album chart and sold over 60,000 copies in that country.

Albums

Studio albums

Live albums

Compilation albums

Demo albums

Extended plays

Singles

As lead artist

As featured artist

Promotional singles

Guest appearances

Music videos

References

Notes

 [ "Dido > Discography"]. Allmusic. Retrieved 25 July 2008.
 [ "Dido > Credits"]. Allmusic. Retrieved 25 July 2008.

Sources

External links
 Official website
 
 

Pop music discographies
Discography
Discographies of British artists